Raymond Warburton (born 7 October 1967 in Rotherham, England) is an English former footballer.

Playing career
Warburton started his career at hometown club Rotherham United, before moving on to York City in August 1989. At York he helped the club win promotion form the Third Division in 1992–93. In February 1994 he moved on to Northampton Town, where he again won promotion to the Second Division, this time via the play-offs in 1997. The following year he moved on to Rushden & Diamonds, where he lifted the Conference National title in 2000–01. After which he joined Boston United, who went on to lift the Conference title in 2001-02. In January 2003 he signed with Aldershot Town, helping them to lift the Isthmian League Premier Division title in 2002–03.

Honours
Northampton Town
Football League Third Division play-offs: 1997

Rushden & Diamonds
Football Conference: 2000–01

Boston United
Football Conference: 2001–02

Aldershot Town
Isthmian League Premier Division: 2002–03

Notes

External links

1967 births
Living people
Footballers from Rotherham
English footballers
Association football defenders
Rotherham United F.C. players
York City F.C. players
Northampton Town F.C. players
Rushden & Diamonds F.C. players
Boston United F.C. players
Aldershot Town F.C. players
English Football League players
National League (English football) players
Isthmian League players